Sean Morrison may refer to:
 Sean J. Morrison, American biology professor
 Sean M. Morrison, Cook County commissioner
 Sean Morrison (beach volleyball) (born 1983), beach volleyball and volleyball player from Trinidad and Tobago
 Sean Morrison (footballer) (born 1991), English footballer for Rotherham United